Stephen Shank is a director, actor, writer, set designer and artist who has worked in theatre and television. He was born of American parents in Brussels, Belgium. He is bilingual in English and French.

He currently lives in Brussels, Belgium.

In July 2011, he will be directing the stage world premiere of Umberto Eco's The Name of the Rose in the ruins of the Cistercian Abbey of Villers-la-Ville, Belgium. See Villers Abbey.

Work

Stage

Director

Actor

References 
 General

 

 Specific

Belgian male actors
21st-century Belgian writers
Belgian male writers
Belgian artists
Belgian theatre directors
Living people
Year of birth missing (living people)